Whitehead railway station serves Whitehead in County Antrim, Northern Ireland.

The station has two platforms with a waiting room on each and the station is signalled in both directions and remains staffed during commuter hours by a Senior Porter, a fully trained signalman, capable of fixing points and signalling issues when they arise.

Previously the line was double towards Belfast and Whitehead was where the track narrowed to the single track section to Larne. However, in the 1990s the up line was removed from here to Kilroot due to safety reasons, leaving the line Whitehead station as a passing loop.

Whitehead actually comprises two stations, due to its history as a railway excursion town. The through station is still part of the Northern Ireland Railways network, whilst the terminus Whitehead Excursion Station is the headquarters of the Railway Preservation Society of Ireland.

Whitehead station was originally opened on 1 May 1863 and the Whitehead Excursion Platform was opened on 10 July 1907. The present station was opened in 1877 and is the third station to serve the town. It has been modernised, but unlike many stations on the NIR network still retains much of its Victorian character.

Service

On Saturdays, the service still runs half-hourly in the same alternating manner, but with less peak trains.

On Sundays, the service reduces to hourly operation in each direction.

Incidents

On 26 September 2008, part of the platform collapsed, blocking the Larne bound line. It is not clear whether this was a result of the recent construction work which had been carried out at this station,. according to NI Railways nobody was hurt in the incident.

References

Railway stations in County Antrim
Railway stations opened in 1863
Railway stations served by NI Railways
Railway stations in Northern Ireland opened in the 19th century